David García Marquina (born 11 April 1970 in Pamplona) is a Spanish former professional cyclist. He rode in 6 editions of the Vuelta a España and 1 Tour de France.

Major results

1988
 1st  Road race, National Junior Road Championships
1993
 1st Road race, Mediterranean Games
1994
 1st Vuelta a Mallorca
 3rd Vuelta a La Rioja
1995
 7th Overall Vuelta a España
1996
 3rd Overall Volta ao Alentejo

References

External links

1970 births
Living people
Spanish male cyclists
Competitors at the 1993 Mediterranean Games
Mediterranean Games competitors for Spain
Sportspeople from Pamplona
Cyclists from Navarre
20th-century Spanish people